The dark-sky movement is a campaign to reduce light pollution. The advantages of reducing light pollution include an increased number of stars visible at night, reducing the effects of electric lighting on the environment, improving the well-being, health and safety of both people and wildlife, and cutting down on energy usage. Earth Hour and National Dark-Sky Week are two examples of such efforts.

The movement started with professional and amateur astronomers alarmed that nocturnal skyglow from urban areas was blotting out the sight of stars. For example, the world-famous Palomar Observatory in California is threatened by sky-glow from the nearby city of Escondido and local businesses. For similar reasons, astronomers in Arizona helped push the governor there to veto a bill in 2012 which would have lifted a ban on illuminated billboards.

Nocturnal animals can be harmed by light pollution because they are biologically evolved to be dependent on an environment with a certain number of hours of uninterrupted daytime and nighttime. The over-illumination of the night sky is affecting these organisms (especially birds). This biological study of darkness is called scotobiology. Light pollution has also been found to affect human circadian rhythms.

The dark-sky movement encourages the use of full-cutoff fixtures that cast little or no light upward in public areas and generally to encourage communities to adopt lighting regulations. A 2011 project is to establish "dark sky oasis" in suburban areas.

Dark-sky lighting 
Dark-sky lighting is a concept very important to the dark-sky movement, as it greatly minimizes light pollution. The concept was started in the 1950s by the city of Flagstaff, Arizona. Flagstaff is a city of over 70,000, but because of their lighting, their skies are dark enough to see the Milky Way. Lights should be shielded on the top and sides so light doesn't go up to the sky and only used when needed (use motion detectors and only the wattage necessary). The International Dark-Sky Association certifies fixtures as dark sky friendly, and these will have the IDA Fixture Seal of Approval. Opinions vary on what color the light should be, but most agree on the description of "warm", which is considered more yellow or orange/amber than white.

Skyglow 

Skyglow is the illumination of the night sky or parts of it, resembling an orange "smog". It occurs from both natural and human-made sources. Artificial skyglow is caused by the over-illumination of the sky from large city centres, shopping centres, or stadiums. It consists of light that is either emitted directly upward or reflected from the ground that is then scattered by dust and gas molecules in the atmosphere, producing a luminous background or light dome. These artificial skyglows cause the sky to be 5–10 times brighter in urban areas than a naturally dark sky that is unaffected by artificial light. Natural skyglow can come from natural light sources, such as the Sun, the Moon, the stars, or auroras.

Some communities are becoming aware of this problem and are putting forth efforts to minimize the hazy, orange skyglow. A community in particular is the city of Merritt, British Columbia. An article published July 8, 2010 states that they are making minor changes to lighting in and around Merritt, such as the installment of down-cast lighting to commercial buildings, as part of their light pollution abatement program. The benefits of this technological change include "saving energy through better focused lights, preserving the environment by reducing excess light that may affect flora and fauna, reducing crime and increasing safety by more adequately illuminating areas, and reducing health risks."

Scotobiology 

Scotobiology is the study of the role darkness plays in living organisms and shows that interrupting darkness by light pollution creates drastic effects for most organisms; changing their food gathering and feeding habits, their mating and reproduction behavior, migration behaviour (birds and insects) and social behavior. Approximately 30% of vertebrates and 60% of invertebrates are nocturnal, meaning that they depend on darkness. Their everyday behaviors are biologically evolved to adapt in uninterrupted darkness.

Human health is also adversely affected by the effects of light pollution. Light during night time hours has been linked to human cancers and psychological disorders.

Dark-sky preserves 

Dark-sky preserves are the main contributors to the dark-sky movement. They are protected areas found mostly in national parks that have a zero light pollution policy set in by the government and controlled by the National Dark Sky Association.

As of February 6, 2012, there were 35 formally recognized dark-sky preserves in the world with Canada in the lead containing 15 preserves. These preserves are located in Nova Scotia, New Brunswick, Quebec, Ontario, Saskatchewan, Alberta, and British Columbia. Other countries that have dark-sky preserves are the Czech Republic, Hungary, Poland, Slovakia, Spain, United Kingdom, and the United States. A current list of designated parks is maintained by the Dark Skies Advisory Group  of the International Union for Conservation of Nature (IUCN).

The parks are put in place by the Dark Sky Places program with the intention to remind us that the night sky serves just as much importance to our culture and history as our day-time sky.

International Dark-Sky Association 

The International Dark-Sky Association (IDA) began in 1988. A non-profit, it manages the Fixture Seal of Approval program, which offers a third-party rating system judging the "sky-friendliness" of lighting fixtures. In 2009, the IDA opened an office for public policy and government affairs in Washington, D.C. to inform lawmakers and lobbyists about the energy efficiency of outdoor lighting and to promote the adoption of energy-saving measures. The IDA has implemented several simple guidelines to responsible outdoor lighting along with some practical considerations.

 In regard to safety, one needs only the right amount of light, in the right place, at the right time. More light often means wasted light and energy.
 Use the lowest wattage of lamp that is feasible. The maximum wattage for most commercial applications should be 250 watts of high intensity discharge lighting, but less is usually sufficient.
 Incorporate curfews (i.e., turn lights off automatically after a certain hour when businesses close or traffic is minimal).

List of groups 

ANPCEN (France)
 Astronomitaly (Italy)
Campaign for Dark Skies (UK)
Canadian Geographic (Canada)
Canadian Scotobiology Group (Canada)
CieloBuio (Italy)
International Dark-Sky Association
National Dark-Sky Week (United States)
Niue
Royal Astronomical Society of Canada (Canada)

See also 

Bortle dark-sky scale
SKYGLOW
Dark-sky preserve
Noctcaelador

References

External links 
International Dark-Sky Association
MyDarkSky – dark sky survey maps
Outdoor Lighting Regulations and Ordinances on Google Earth 
Interactive map comparing U.S. dark sky laws
The dark sky movement – yahoo
Jasper National Park 
Dark-sky parks of the world
Flagstaff Dark Skies Coalition
Globe at Night
Cities at Night
Dark Skies Awareness 
The Consortium for Dark Sky Studies

Environmental movements
Light pollution